Karolis Zlatkauskas (born 19 February 1985) is a Lithuanian biathlete. He competed in the men's sprint event at the 2006 Winter Olympics.

In February 2014, Zlatkauskas admitted to doping after a test performed in December 2013 revealed traces of erythropoietin.

References

External links
 

1985 births
Living people
Lithuanian male biathletes
Olympic biathletes of Lithuania
Biathletes at the 2006 Winter Olympics
Sportspeople from Vilnius